Spiral is a 2014 Russian action film directed by Andrey Volgin.

Plot
Alexey, a talented programmer from Novosibirsk, comes to Moscow and becomes a member of a closed semi-legal elite club called  Spiral. As a beginner he is lucky, and he wins one extreme game of the club after another, getting crazy fees. He falls in love with a girl that he could not even dream about.

But overnight the beautiful world around him collapses, and he gets into big trouble - he is accused of robbing a bank, a beloved girl does not believe in his innocence, and on top of everything he is trying to kill.

Cast
 Anatoly Rudenko as Alexey
 Konstantin Kryukov as Stas
 Klarissa Barskaya as Katya
 Ramilya Iskander as Katya (voice)
 Veniamin Smekhov as Yakob
 Aleksandr Yatsko as Boris
 Nikita Vysotsky as Leonid
 Konstantin Glushkov as Uncle Vitya
 Vladimir Sterzhakov as Mikhail, lawyer
 Odin Biron as Sasha, Yakob's assistant

References

External links
 

2014 films
2010s Russian-language films
2014 action films
Russian action films
Films shot in Moscow